The  Cima delle Saline is a mountain of the Ligurian Alps located in Piedmont (NW Italy).

Toponymy  
Cima delle Saline literally means Summit of the salt marshes. The name comes the neighbouring Passo delle Saline, a mountain pass which was used in the past by marchants in order to bring into the Po Plain the salt produced by the Mediterranean sea.

Geography 

The mountain rises in the karstic complex of the Marguareis, on the water divide between the valleys of Ellero and Tanaro. At 2,612 metres above sea level, is the third elevation of the Ligurian Alps after Marguareis and Mongioie. Its prevailing rocks are Jurassic limestones. The north face of the Cima delle Saline consists in almost vertical cliffs, while its southern side is a long and gentler slope, rich in sinkholes. If seen from the plain, its summit shows a characteristic rounded shape.

SOIUSA classification 
According to the SOIUSA (International Standardized Mountain Subdivision of the Alps) the mountain can be classified in the following way:
 main part = Western Alps
 major sector = South Western Alps
 section = Ligurian Alps
 subsection = It:Alpi del Marguareis/Fr:Alpes Liguriennes Occidentales
 supergroup = It:Catena Marguareis-Mongioie/Fr:Chaîne Marguareis-Mongioie
 group =It:Mongioie-Mondolè
 subgroup = It:Nodo del Mongioie
 code = I/A-1.II-B.4.a

Conservation 
Since 1978 the mountain and its southern slopes belong to the Natural Park of Marguareis.

Access to the summit

Summer 
Reaching the summit does not require alpinistic skill but some scrambling. A waymarked itinerary which follows the GTA route upo to the Passo delle Saline (a saddle connecting Tanaro and Ellero valleys) amc then the E ridge of the mountain starts from Carnino Inferiore, a village in the comune of Briga Alta, in the upper Tanaro valley. It is also possible to reach the summit from Pian Marchisio (Ellero Valley, North of the mountain), also through the Passo delle Saline. The Cima delle Saline is also a challenging climb for mountain biking.

Winter 
The mountain is also accessible in winter by ski mountaineers, but early spring is considered the best period for this ascent.

Mountain huts 
 Rifugio Mongioie and Rifugio Ciarlo-Bossi (Tanaro valley),
 Rifugio Havis De Giorgio and Rifugio Garelli (Ellero valley).

Maps

References

Saline
Saline
Saline